The Wonboyn River, an open youthful wave dominated barrier estuary or perennial stream, is located in the South Coast region of New South Wales, Australia.

Course and features
The river flows generally east, northeast, and then southeast, joined by one minor tributary, flowing through Wonboyn Lake, before reaching its mouth within Disaster Bay, at the Tasman Sea of the South Pacific Ocean southeast of Green Cape. The river descends  over its  course.

See also

 Rivers of New South Wales
 List of rivers of New South Wales (L-Z)
 List of rivers of Australia

References

External links
 

 

Rivers of New South Wales
South Coast (New South Wales)